Olympus is a popular mountain name, given to several peaks on Earth and one on Mars.

Europe
Mountains called Olympus (Όλυμπος) in Greek antiquity, located on the Greek mainland (notably Mount Olympus in Thessaly) and Mount Olympus (Cyprus), as well as on Aegean and Mediterranean islands, and in Anatolia:

North America

Elsewhere